In probability theory and statistics, the negative hypergeometric distribution describes probabilities for when sampling from a finite population without replacement in which each sample can be classified into two mutually exclusive categories like Pass/Fail or Employed/Unemployed. As random selections are made from the population, each subsequent draw decreases the population causing the probability of success to change with each draw. Unlike the standard hypergeometric distribution, which describes the number of successes in a fixed sample size, in the negative hypergeometric distribution, samples are drawn until  failures have been found, and the distribution describes the probability of finding  successes in such a sample.  In other words, the negative hypergeometric distribution describes the likelihood of  successes in a sample with exactly  failures.

Definition 

Elements are drawn one after the other, without replacements, until  failures are encountered. Then, the drawing stops and the number  of successes is counted. The negative hypergeometric distribution,  is the discrete distribution of this .

The negative hypergeometric distribution is a special case of the beta-binomial distribution with parameters  and  both being integers (and ).

The outcome requires that we observe  successes in  draws and the  bit must be a failure. The probability of the former can be found by the direct application of the hypergeometric distribution  and the probability of the latter is simply the number of failures remaining  divided by the size of the remaining population . The probability of having exactly  successes up to the  failure (i.e. the drawing stops as soon as the sample includes the predefined number of  failures) is then the product of these two probabilities: 

Therefore, a random variable  follows the negative hypergeometric distribution if its probability mass function (pmf) is given by

where
  is the population size,
  is the number of success states in the population,
  is the number of failures,
  is the number of observed successes,
  is a binomial coefficient
By design the probabilities sum up to 1. However, in case we want show it explicitly we have:

where we have used that,

Expectation 

where we have used the relationship , that we derived above to show that the negative hypergeometric distribution was properly normalized.

Variance 
The variance can be derived by the following calculation.

Then the variance is

Related distributions 
If the drawing stops after a constant number  of draws (regardless of the number of failures), then the number of successes has the hypergeometric distribution, .  The two functions are related in the following way:

Negative-hypergeometric distribution (like the hypergeometric distribution) deals with draws without replacement, so that the probability of success is different in each draw. In contrast, negative-binomial distribution (like the binomial distribution) deals with draws with replacement, so that the probability of success is the same and the trials are independent. The following table summarizes the four distributions related to drawing items:

Some authors define the negative hypergeometric distribution to be the number of draws required to get the th failure. If we let  denote this number then it is clear that  where  is as defined above. Hence the PMF . If we let the number of failures  be denoted by  means that we have . It is clear that  and that .

References 

Discrete distributions
Factorial and binomial topics